Filladhoo (Dhivehi: ފިއްލަދޫ) is one of the inhabited islands of  Haa Alif Atoll and geographically part of Thiladhummathi Atoll in the north of the Maldives. It is an island-level administrative constituency governed by the Filladhoo Island Council.

Geography
This island lies on a large reef and it has a large sandy projection that stretches northwards to Dhapparu, formerly a separate island.

Important Bird Area
Haa Alifu Atoll, along with the adjacent reef waters, forms a 6,000 ha Important Bird Area (IBA), designated as such by BirdLife International because it supports a population of some 15,000 lesser noddies, as estimated in 2001.

Demography

Services

Education
Madhrasathul Sobaah is the Government school in Filladhoo, providing primary and secondary education for the island. Established in 1998, it now has around 130 students.

Health
The island has a health center providing basic health facilities.

References

External links 
Isles Profile - Filladhoo

Islands of the Maldives
Important Bird Areas of the Maldives